2021 WDF season of darts comprises every tournament of World Darts Federation. The prize money of the tournaments may vary depending on category.

WDF most important tournaments are the WDF World Darts Championship, WDF World Masters or WDF World Cup.

2021 is the first year in which the calendar will be under WDF-sole management after the liquidation of BDO.

Due to COVID–19-related restrictions and lockdowns in many countries, calendar has been disrupted by the cancelling or postponing of several tournaments. WDF resumed their darts calendar in June 2021.

Tournament categories, points & prize money

Calendar

January–May

June

July

August

September

October

November

December

Tournaments cancelled
Following tournaments have been postponed until 2022.

Statistical information

The players/nations are sorted by:
 Total number of titles;
 Cumulated importance of those titles;
 Alphabetical order (by family names for players).

Titles won by player (men's)

Titles won by nation (men's)

Titles won by player (women's)

Titles won by nation (women's)

Rankings
Only the best ten points achievements by players in WDF Ranked Tournaments accounts towards the WDF Rankings

Updated to November 28, 2021

Men's

Women's

References

External links
2021 WDF calendar

2021 in darts